Huntingdale railway station is a commuter railway station located adjacent to the suburbs of Oakleigh and Huntingdale located in the south east of Melbourne, Victoria in Australia. The station originally opened in 1927 as "East Oakleigh". It did not receive its current name until 1954. The station consists of a single island platform connected to both Railway Avenue and Haughton Road via a pedestrian subway.  

Huntingdale station is currently served by the Pakenham and Cranbourne lines which are both part of the Melbourne Railway Network. Additionally the station is served by five bus routes including the 601 university shuttle and SmartBus route 900. The station is approximately 17 kilometres (10.6 mi) or around a 30 minute train ride away from Flinders Street.

Description 

Huntingdale railway station is located on the border of the suburbs of Oakleigh and Huntingdale. On the north-eastern side of the station is Railway Avenue and Haughton Road is to the south-west. The station is owned by VicTrack, a state government agency, and is operated by Metro Trains Melbourne. The station is approximately 17 kilometres (10.6 mi) or around a 30 minute train ride away from Flinders Street. 

Huntingdale station consists of a single island platform connected to both Railway Avenue and Haughton Road via a  pedestrian subway. There is a single station building which primarily serves as a waiting room.

The main car park at the station is located on Railway Avenue just north-east of the station. Although there are ramps they do not fully comply with the Disability Discrimination Act of 1992 as the gradient of the ramps is steeper than the maximum of 1:14 allowed under the Act.

History
Opening on 25 June 1927, Huntingdale station, like the suburb itself, gets its name from the Melbourne Hunt Club, which occupied parts of the suburb (then known as Oakleigh East) from 1887 to 1929. The land that was occupied by the Hunt Club was later acquired by the Eastern Golf Club which subsequently became the Huntingdale Golf Club in 1940. The station received its current name in 1954 when "Huntingdale" became the accepted named for the former suburb of East Oakleigh.

In 1970, the signal box and interlocked gates at the station were removed, as part of the grade separation of the North Road level crossing. During this time a temporary level crossing was provided with boom barriers whilst construction was undertaken and, in that year, the current station building and underpass were provided. In 1971, the island platform was extended at the south-eastern end.

In March 2011 there was a significant amount of garbage dumped at the station car park. Metro Trains Melbourne cleaned 60 cubic metres of rubbish on 18 March 2011, at a cost of around $7,000. A survey of commuters in August 2011 rated Huntingdale among the worst stations in Melbourne because of rubbish and graffiti at the station, unsafe access and flooding of the subway.

In 2013 there was a lobbying campaign by Monash University, Clayton campus seeking improvements to Huntingdale station and the bus interchange. Connecting bus services were often far away from the station with bus stops having no lighting or shelters avaliable. The condition of the station and bus interchange was a serious concern for Clayton campus, because Huntingdale station is a major gateway to the university through bus route 601. In 2015 the decision to construct a $5 million bus interchange was announced by the Andrews Government which was expected address these concerns.

In 2018 the station received a $11.6 million upgrade which turned the station into a transport hub. The main project during this upgrade was the construction of a new bus interchange which cost $5 million. The existing car park was also upgraded with additional parking installed. In 2015 the project was said to cost $7.6 million which is about $4 million less than the project's final cost.

Platforms and services
The station is currently served by both the Pakenham and Cranbourne lines which are both operated by Metro Trains Melbourne. Services to Pakenham and Cranbourne travel together south-east towards Dandenong before spliting into two separate lines. Services to the city run express from Caulfield (Malvern during off-peak) to South Yarra before stopping all stations to Flinders Street via the City Loop. 

Platform 1
  express services to Flinders Street
  express services to Flinders Street

Platform 2
  all stations and limited express services to Pakenham
  all stations services to Cranbourne

Future services
In addition to the current services the Network Development Plan Metropolitan Rail proposes linking the Pakenham and Cranbourne lines to both the Sunbury line and under-construction Melbourne Airport rail link via the Metro Tunnel.
  express services to West Footscray and Sunbury (2025 onwards)
  express services to Melbourne Airport (2029 onwards)

Transport links
Huntingdale is served by 5 bus routes all departing from the bus interchange just north of the station on Haughton Road. These routes are the prepaid route 601, 631, 704 and SmartBus route 900.  Huntingdale station currently has no dedicated rail replacement bus stop and instead rail replacement services share a stop with another service.

Bus Connections 
 : to Monash University Clayton Campus

 : Elwood to Monash University Clayton Campus
 : Westall station to Oakleigh station
  : Rowville to Caulfield station

References

External links
 Melway map at street-directory.com.au

Railway stations in Melbourne
Railway stations in Australia opened in 1927
Railway stations in the City of Monash